Ida Vitale (born 2 November 1923) is a Uruguayan poet, translator, essayist, lecturer and literary critic.

Life 

She played an important role in the Uruguayan art movement known as the 'Generation of 45': Carlos Maggi, Manuel Flores Mora, Ángel Rama (who also became her second husband), Emir Rodríguez Monegal, Idea Vilariño, Carlos Real de Azúa, Carlos Martínez Moreno, Mario Arregui, Mauricio Muller, José Pedro Díaz, Amanda Berenguer, Tola Invernizzi, Mario Benedetti, Líber Falco, Juan Cunha, Juan Carlos Onetti, among others.

Vitale fled to Mexico City in 1973 for political asylum after a military junta took power in Uruguay. She resided in Austin, Texas until 2016, when she returned to Montevideo, where she currently resides. Vitale is the last surviving member of the Generation of 45. She is the recipient of multiple literary prizes and honors for the literary texts she has published. In 2019 she was awarded a Cervantes prize for her lifetime achievement.

Prizes and honors
 2019, One of the BBC's 100 women
 2018, Miguel de Cervantes Prize
 2016, Premio Internacional de Poesía Federico García Lorca
 2015, Premio Reina Sofía de poesía Iberoamericana
 2014, Alfonso Reyes Prize
 2010, Honorary Doctor of Letters (Doctor Honoris Causa) degree from la Universidad de la República de Uruguay.
 2009, Premio Octavio Paz.

Partial bibliography
 — (1953). Palabra dada. Montevideo: La Galatea. OCLC 9317153
 — (1960). Cada uno en su noche, poesía. Montevideo: Editorial Alfa. OCLC 4941102
 — (1968). La poesía de los años veinte. Montevideo, Uruguay: Centro Editor de América Latina. OCLC 684036
 — (1968). Fermentario Carlos Vaz Ferreira. Montevideo: Centro Editor de America Latina. OCLC 79919537
 — (1972). Oidor andante. [Montevideo]: Arca. OCLC 1399898
 — (1982). Fieles. Colección Cuadernos de poesía. México, D.F.: Universidad Nacional Autónoma de México. 
 — (1984). Entresaca. México: Editoral Oasis. OCLC 60657853
 — (1988). Sueños de la constancia. México: Fondo de Cultura Económica. 
 — (1992). Serie del sinsonte. Montevideo?: P.F.E. OCLC 47765264
 — (1994). Léxico de afinidades. México, D.F.: Editorial Vuelta. 
 — (1996). Donde vuela el camaleón. [Montevideo, Uruguay]: Vintén Editor. 
 — (1998). Procura de lo imposible. México: Fondo de cultura económica. 
 — (1998). De varia empresa. Caracas, Venezuela: Fondo Editorial Pequeña Venecia. 
 — & Sosa, V. (1998). Ida Vitale. Material de lectura, 196. México: Universidad Nacional Autónoma de México, Coordinación de difusión Cultural, Dirección de Literatura. 
 — (1999). Un invierno equivocado. México, D.F.: CIDCLI. 
 — (1999). La luz de esta memoria. Montevideo: La Galatea. 
 — (2002). Reducción del infinito. Barcelona: Tusquets Editores. 
 — (2003). De plantas y animales: acercamientos literarios. Paidós Amateurs, 10. México: Paidós. 
 — (2004). El abc de byobu. Ciudad de México: Taller Ditoria. 
 — (2005). Trema. Colección La Cruz del sur, 767. Valencia: Editorial Pre-Textos. 
 —, Pollack, S., & Vitale, I. (2007). Reason enough. Austin, TX: Host Publications.

External resources 
Ida Vitale recorded for the Archive of Literature of the Hispanic Division at the Library of Congress, Washington D.C. on September 12, 1986. Ms. Vitale reads the following works from her anthology, Fieles: "Palabra dada", "Cada uno en su noche", "Oidor andante", "Jardín de sílice", "Hora nona", "Se noi siamo figure di specchio", and "Sueños de la constancia".

See also
 Latin American Literature

References

1923 births
Writers from Montevideo
20th-century Uruguayan poets
Uruguayan academics
Uruguayan essayists
Uruguayan translators
Uruguayan emigrants to the United States
Uruguayan literary critics
Women literary critics
Living people
Uruguayan women poets
20th-century Uruguayan women writers
21st-century Uruguayan women writers
Writers from Austin, Texas
BBC 100 Women
Recipients of the Delmira Agustini Medal
Premio Cervantes winners